Phylicia George (born November 16, 1987) is a Canadian Olympic track and field athlete and bobsledder.

Career

Hurdles
George competed at the 2011 World Championships in Daegu, South Korea reaching the final in the 100m hurdles. She went on to make her Olympic Games debut at the 2012 Summer Olympics and competed in the 100m hurdles, finishing in sixth place. George qualified for London, England after finishing second in the 100m hurdles just one day after winning the 100m at the Canadian Track and Field Championships in Calgary.

In July 2016 she was officially named to Canada's Olympic team. George finished eighth in the women's 100 metres hurdles event, with a time of 12.89 in the final.

Bobsleigh
In November 2016, George made the decision to compete in bobsleigh during the winter season. George made her World Cup debut in December 2017, finishing fourth with Kaillie Humphries. She won her first World Cup race on 6 January 2018 in Altenberg, Germany, with Kaillie Humphries.  At the 2018 Winter Olympics in Pyeongchang, South Korea, George and Humphries won the bronze medal in the two-woman bobsleigh event.

Achievements

References

External links
 
 
 
 
 
 
 

1987 births
Living people
Athletes (track and field) at the 2012 Summer Olympics
Canadian female hurdlers
Canadian people of Grenadian descent
Black Canadian female track and field athletes
Olympic track and field athletes of Canada
Sportspeople from Markham, Ontario
Commonwealth Games competitors for Canada
Athletes (track and field) at the 2014 Commonwealth Games
Athletes (track and field) at the 2015 Pan American Games
World Athletics Championships athletes for Canada
Athletes (track and field) at the 2016 Summer Olympics
Canadian female bobsledders
Bobsledders at the 2018 Winter Olympics
Olympic bobsledders of Canada
Olympic bronze medalists for Canada
Olympic medalists in bobsleigh
Medalists at the 2018 Winter Olympics
Pan American Games track and field athletes for Canada